Vytautas Magnus University Education Academy – an academical unit of Vytautas Magnus University, which specialized in preparing school teachers and other educators. Located in Vilnius and Kaunas, Lithuania.

Name changes
 1935–1939 National Pedagogical Institute
 1939–1992 Vilnius Pedagogical Institute
 1992–2011 Vilnius Pedagogical University
 2011–2018 Lithuanian University of Educational Sciences
 2019–present Vytautas Magnus University Education Academy

History
The first pedagogical institution in Lithuania was established in Klaipėda in 1935 by the Lithuanian government and was called the National Pedagogical Institute. After the Nazi Germany ultimatum to Lithuania in March 1939, the Nazis took control of the Klaipėda Region. The institute was moved to Panevėžys. After Lithuania regained portions of the Vilnius Region, the institution was moved to Vilnius in the autumn of 1939. It was renamed to Vilnius Pedagogical Institute (Vilniaus pedagoginis institutas).

In 1940, due to the Soviet invasion and occupation, teacher training was reformed according to Soviet standards which affected VPI as the number of students increased due to the changes. After Lithuania regained independence in 1990, the Institute was given the title of a university by the Supreme Council of the Republic Lithuania on 20 May 1992 and reformed into Vilnius Pedagogical University. In October 2011 the university was renamed to Lithuanian University of Educational Sciences.

From January 2019, the university became an integral part of the Vytautas Magnus University as the Education Academy.

Structure
Faculties and institutes
 Faculty of Education
 Faculty of Philology
 Faculty of Science and Technologies
 Faculty of History
 Faculty of Lithuanian Philology
 Faculty of Social Education
 Faculty of Sports and Health Education
 Professional Competence Development Institute

Library

The library is located on the main university campus and has these departments:
 Administration
 Acquisition Department
 Branch Library for Humanities
 Library Automation Department
 Readers' Services and Reference Department
 Storage Department
 Processing Department

Other university departments
 54 departments belonging to faculties
 Agrobiological station

Directors and rectors
 1935–1937 Vytautas Soblys
 1937–1940 Mečislovas Mačernis
 1940–1941 Jonas Laužikas
 1941–1943 Albinas Liaugminas
 1944 Jonas Alekna
 1944–1945 Povilas Brazdžiūnas
 1945–1946 Jonas Laužikas
 1946–1947 Antanas Šurkus
 1947–1948 Adolfas Jucys
 1948–1950 Jonas Šalkauskas
 1951–1955 Marcelinas Ročka
 1955–1960 Juozas Mickevičius
 1960–1979 Vytautas Uogintas
 1979–1989 Jonas Aničas
 1989–1993 Saulius Razma
 1993–2003 Antanas Pakerys
 Since 2003 Algirdas Gaižutis

References

External links
 University homepage 
 University homepage 

Lithuanian University of Educational Sciences
Educational institutions established in 1935
1935 establishments in Lithuania